Isaac and Amy Post, were radical Hicksite Quakers from Rochester, New York, and leaders in the nineteenth-century anti-slavery and women's rights movements. Among the first believers in Spiritualism, they helped to associate the young religious movement with the political ideas of the reform movement.

Early life
Isaac Post was born February 26, 1798, in Westbury, New York, to Edmund and Catherine (Willetts) Post, members of the Religious Society of Friends, also known as Quakers. Amy Kirby Post was born December 20, 1802, in Jericho, New York, among the eight children of Joseph and Mary (Seaman) Kirby, who were also Quakers. Commitment to humanitarian reform was characteristic of Quakers and foundational to the Posts' later work as abolitionists and women's-rights activists.

Around 1821 Isaac married Amy's elder sister Hannah. In 1823 they moved to the village of Scipio in Cayuga County, New York, and established a farm where Amy soon came to live with them. In 1827 Hannah fell ill and died, and Amy became nursemaid to her sister's two children.

Also in 1827 Elias Hicks, a relative of the Kirbys, charged that the Religious Society of Friends had lost its way, initiating a split of the "Hicksites", including Isaac Post, from their more orthodox brethren. When in 1829 Amy Kirby married Isaac Post, criticism for having taken a "Hicksite husband" led to her withdrawal from the Jericho Meeting to which she had belonged since birth. In addition to her niece and nephew, Amy's maternal responsibilities came to include four more children she had with Isaac: Jacob (1830), Joseph (1834), Matilda (1840), and Willet (1847). The couple moved to Rochester in 1836.

Abolitionists
The couple quickly became involved in radical causes. Amy Post became an active and visible member of the Genesee Yearly Meeting of Hicksite Friends (GYM). Post, alongside her husband Isaac, dedicated much of her time to a very progressive group of Quakers who sought to give both men and women the same rights during the meetings of the Religious Society of Friends. In 1837, Amy Post went against the desires of the Religious Society of Friends elders, who disapproved of slavery but distrusted radical abolitionism, and signed her first "worldly" petition against slavery. In 1842, Amy and Isaac Post became two of the founders of the Western New York Anti-Slavery Society (WNYASS). WNYASS was not an abolitionist group only for Quakers. Among its members were evangelical Protestants and deists. As an officer of the society, it was Amy Post's duty to organize fundraising fairs and group conventions. Despite the fact that the Religious Society of Friends was a firmly anti-slavery group, the elders of the Rochester Monthly Meeting (RMM) accused Amy Kirby Post of being too worldly in her efforts of trying to abolish slavery. Post disregarded the RMM's investigations of her "worldly" efforts and continued to be a Quaker abolitionist. She even continued distributing religious testimonies on the American Anti-Slavery Society's official letterhead. For the Posts there should be no boundary between the religious beliefs of a Quaker and political activism of an abolitionist.

By the early 1840s, radical Quakers began to hold abolitionist meetings in the Post home, where prominent reform lecturers such as William Lloyd Garrison, Frederick Douglass, Susan B. Anthony, and Sojourner Truth visited and spoke. Douglass became a close personal friend of the Posts who helped establish him in Rochester where he published his newspaper the "North Star".    Douglass and the Posts also collaborated in ferrying fugitive slaves and their home served as a station on the Underground Railroad, holding as many as 20 escaped slaves at a time.

One Saturday night, after all our household were asleep, there came a tiny tap at the door, and the door was opened to fifteen tired and hungry men and women who were escaping from the land of slavery.  They seemed to know that Canada, their home of rest, was near, and they were impatient, but the opportunity to cross the lake compelled their waiting until Monday early in the morning.  That being settled, and their hunger satisfied, together with a comfortable and refreshing sleep, they became so elated with their nearness to perfect and lasting freedom that they were forgetful of any danger either to us, or to themselves, so that they were obliged to be constantly watched through the day to keep them from popping their heads out of the windows and otherwise showing themselves. ... The welcome Monday morning came, and after a hearty breakfast, and a lunch for dinner, they left the house, with all the stillness and quietness possible, and we soon saw them on board a Canada steamer, which was already lying at the dock; with them on board, it immediately shoved out into the middle of the stream, hoisted the British flag, and we knew that all was safe; we breathed more freely, but when we saw them standing on deck with uncovered heads, shouting their good-byes, thanks and ejaculations, we could not restrain our tears of thankfulness for their happy escape, mixed with deep shame that our own boasted land of liberty offered no shelter of safety for them.|Amy Post

In 1848, the Posts also left the GYM due to pressure from elders to end their abolitionist activities as well as to help form the Yearly Meeting of Congregational Friends (YMCF), which differed greatly from the GYM in several ways. They had no ministers or elders as all people were considered equal within the YMCF. The members of YMCF would do whatever they considered necessary to end slavery, and therefore put no limit on "worldly" efforts to abolish slavery. Finally, the YMCF had no tolerance for racial or sexual discrimination. They believed that all people should be considered equal morally, religiously, and politically. The motto of the Congregational Friends was "common natures, common rights, and a common destiny."

Women's rights
In 1848, Amy Post began to be involved as an organizer in the women's movement.  Acting upon her beliefs in equality for women, she attended the Seneca Falls Convention in 1848 in Seneca Falls, NY. She and Mary Post, her stepdaughter, were among the one hundred women and men who signed the Declaration of Sentiments, which was first presented there.

Two weeks later, she and several other women who had participated in the Seneca Falls Convention organized the Rochester Women's Rights Convention in the Post's hometown of Rochester, New York.  A planning meeting chose Amy Post as temporary chair and designated a nominating committee to propose a slate of officers. The Seneca Falls Convention had followed tradition by electing a man as president of the convention. Defying tradition, the Rochester organizers proposed a woman, Abigail Bush, for that position. When the convention assembled in the Rochester Unitarian Church on August 2, Amy Post called it to order and read the suggested slate of officers.  The proposal for a woman to be president of the convention was strongly opposed by some of the leaders of the women's movement who were present, fearing that women were not yet ready to take that step. Bush was elected despite the opposition, making this the first public meeting of both men and women in the U. S.  whose presiding officer was a woman. Amy Post continued to attend women's rights conventions, and at a convention in Rochester in 1853, she signed "The Just and Equal Rights of Women" resolution.

Accompanied by Lucy Coleman, Post visited fugitive slave colonies in Canada, and attended conventions all through the North. Post became good friends with Harriet Jacobs, who she encouraged to write Incidents in the Life of a Slave Girl (published in 1861 under the name "Linda Brent").

Amy served the community in practical and tangible ways, such as collecting food, medical supplies, and clothing for freed slaves during the Civil War. After the War, Post became a member of both the Equal Rights Association and the National Woman Suffrage Association. In 1872, Amy Kirby Post successfully registered herself to vote, but unlike Susan B. Anthony, she was turned away at the polls and unable to cast her vote. Undaunted, Post continued her women's equality work throughout her life, and in 1885 became one of the founding members of the Women's Political Club. In 1888, Post traveled to Washington D.C. to attend the International Council of Women, the largest women's convention at that time.

Spiritualism
In 1848, the Posts took into their home the Fox sisters, Kate and Margaret, who appeared to have acquired the ability to communicate with spirits through rapping noises. They introduced the girls to their circle of radical friends, and almost all became ardent believers in the emerging religion of Spiritualism. Isaac Post himself became an acknowledged medium. His 1852 book, Voices From the Spirit World, Being Communications From Many Spirits, was presented as the spirit writings of eminent persons such as Benjamin Franklin and George Fox.

Family
Isaac's brother, Joseph (1803–1888), was also an abolitionist and had early differences with the Quakers, although they finally came around to his point of view.  He encouraged Isaac T. Hopper, Charles Marriot, and James S. Gibbons when they were disowned by the Religious Society of Friends on account of their outspoken opposition to slavery. Joseph spent his whole life in the house where he was born.

Legacy

Isaac Post died in April 1872. Amy Post died January 29, 1889. They are buried in Mount Hope Cemetery in Rochester, New York. Amy Kirby Post is remembered for her relentless fight for abolition, her extreme involvement in Women's rights activism, and her association with other well-known abolitionists and women's rights activists. Her dedication to her religious and political beliefs left a lasting impression on future women's rights activists.

Notes

References
 
 
 
 
 
 Hewitt, Nancy A. "Post, Amy Kirby." American National Biography Online. Oxford: Oxford University Press, 2000. | url= http://www.anb.org/articles/15/15-00553.html |
 Ripley, C. Peter. The Black Abolitionist Papers: Vol. 3, United States, 1830–1846. North Carolina: Chapel Hill University Press, 1991. Also available online at | url=  https://web.archive.org/web/20080226213028/http://www.netlibrary.com/ |
 Western New York Suffragists: Amy Kirby Post. Rochester Regional Library Council: 2000. | url=   |

Further reading

External links
 Amy Kirby Post biography on History of Women's Suffrage site
 Isaac Post biography on History of Women's Suffrage site
 The Post Family Papers Project at the University of Rochester, which  contains digitized letters
 
 

1802 births
1798 births
1872 deaths
1889 deaths
19th-century occultists
American Quakers
American spiritualists
American suffragists
Burials at Mount Hope Cemetery (Rochester)
Quaker abolitionists
Married couples
Underground Railroad people
Quaker feminists
Women civil rights activists